Manisha Kelkar is an actress from India. She appears mainly in Bollywood (Hindi) and Marathi movies.  Kelkar also works as an anchor.

Early life and education
Kelkar was born in Mumbai, the daughter of Ram Kelkar, a screenwriter, and Jeevan Kala, a film actress and dancer. Manisha holds a B.Sc. degree in microbiology and post-graduate degree in filmmaking.

Career
Kelkar made her screen debut in 2007 in the Marathi film Hyancha Kahi Nem Nahi, and has appeared regularly in films since then. Kelkar has also hosted Marathi film awards, Cricket World Cup host on Zee Marathi and other shows. In 2018, she was part of India's first all-women Formula LGB car racing team.

Filmography

Films

Anchor

Reality show

See also

 Cinema of India
 Bollywood
 Reality television
 Maharashtra State Film Awards
 Marathi movies

References

External links 
 

Indian film actresses
Year of birth missing (living people)
Living people
Actresses from Mumbai
Actresses in Hindi cinema
Marathi actors
Actresses in Marathi cinema
21st-century Indian actresses